The mixed doubles tennis competition was one of five tennis events at the 1924 Summer Olympics. 42 players (21 pairs) from 14 nations competed in the event, held from 14 to 21 July at the Stade Olympique Yves-du-Manoir. The United States had both of its pairs reach the final, with Hazel Hotchkiss Wightman and R. Norris Williams defeating Marion Zinderstein and Vincent Richards for the gold medal. It was the first mixed doubles victory for the United States. Netherlands, in its debut in the event, took bronze with Kea Bouman and Hendrik Timmer having a walkover victory in the bronze-medal match against Kathleen McKane Godfree and Brian Gilbert of Great Britain.

Background

This was the fourth appearance of mixed doubles tennis. The event was first held in 1900 and would not be held again until 1912 (when both outdoor and indoor versions were held); it would then be held the next two Games in 1920 and 1924. Tennis was not a medal sport from 1928 to 1984, though there were demonstration events in 1968 (which included mixed doubles) and 1984 (which did not). Mixed doubles did not return with the rest of the tennis programme in 1988; instead, it was not until 2012 that mixed doubles returned to the programme, where it has been since.

Greece, Hungary, India, Ireland, the Netherlands, and Spain each made their mixed doubles debut. France competed for the fourth time, the only nation to have competed at each previous edition.

Competition format

The competition was a single-elimination tournament with a bronze-medal match. All matches were best-of-three sets.

Schedule

Draw

Finals

Top half

Bottom half

References

Sources
ITF, 2008 Olympic Tennis Event Media Guide

 

X=Mixed doubles
1924
1924 in French women's sport
1924 in French tennis
Mixed events at the 1924 Summer Olympics